David Quentin Gale (2 October 1936 – 18 August 1991) was a British character actor.

He is primarily known for his role as the evil, treacherous (and re-animated) neurosurgeon Dr. Carl Hill in the 1985 cult classic film Re-Animator, and its 1990 sequel Bride of Re-Animator. After Re-Animator's success, he was cast as a villain in a number of other science fiction and horror films such as The Guyver, The First Power, Syngenor, and The Brain, before his death due to complications of open heart surgery in 1991.

David Gale was also a soap opera actor in the seventies and eighties, appearing as the priest Mark Reddin on The Secret Storm from 1972–74, mobster Beau Richardson on The Edge of Night from 1976–77, and evil Father-In-Law Rusty Sentell, Sr. on Search for Tomorrow from 1982-83.

Biography 

David Gale was born October 2, 1936 in Wimbledon, UK, but moved with his family to New Jersey at a young age. He grew up in a very religious environment; participating in a Catholic choir as a child, and eventually attending St. James Catholic High School in Red Bank, NJ. In 1950, at age thirteen, David ran away from home to New York, citing Catholic guilt and emotional struggles. He survived by getting a job as a busboy in an Italian restaurant. He states:"I looked old for my age. When I was 13, I was very tall-- almost as tall as I am now-- and I'm 6'3". As a rebellion against my strict religious upbringing and my Catholic guilts, I ran around with the fastest crowd I could find. But that wasn't enough. I got itchy to move. I left Red Bank, New Jersey, where I was going to school, and headed for New York with one of my buddies. I got a job as a busboy and waiter in a spaghetti joint. I used a false name and address and even got a social security card."
         
He referenced this period of his life often while playing Father Mark Reddin on The Secret Storm, relating the religious conflict the character experienced to his own personal struggles. In one such article, he even mentions an instance where a nun hit him over the back with a broom, breaking the broom.

David stayed in Red Bank, NJ until his sophomore year of high school. He dropped out and joined the air force, where he was stationed in Tripoli, Libya. While in the service, he met an older couple he deemed his "Mother and Father in the theatre", which, if it weren't for them, David claimed he would not have pursued acting as a career. He joined the Little Theatre Troupe while stationed in Libya after seeing a casting call in the paper for John Loves Mary. Afterwards, he was hooked, and after his second appearance in a production, he claimed to have "cried and cried with joy from the sheer thrill of it all," as the curtain came down, stating, "I thought to myself, 'I found a home-- the theatre'."

Upon returning to New York, David immediately sought acting gigs, determined to "set the world on fire". He struggled to get his foot in the door, though, so he made do with many odd-end occupations, including: a bartender, a carpenter, a pinboy in a bowling alley, a treetopper, a taxi driver, a sculptor, etc. During this time he would study at the Royal Academy of Dramatic Art (London) and the Actor's Studio (New York). In 1963, he would also enter his first marriage with Sandra Edmonds and have his first child, Meighan Gale. He ran his own experimental theatre in the late sixties and early seventies, the Workshop of the Players Art in New York. During this time he struggled financially, sleeping on the stage of his theatre for about a month. He also battled food insecurity. He gave up running the WPA theatre in 1971, stating, "I got tired of starving-- and tired of the city".

David (now split from his first wife), continued to pursue his acting career. He toured Europe performing and starred in many theatre productions, including Hatful of Rain, Elizabeth the Queen (Essex - Fall, 1958), White Devil, Baal, Oh! Calcutta, West Side Story, Dr. Hero, The Crucible (John Proctor), Terra Nova (Scott), Of Mice and Men (Slim - Dec. 18, 1974), The Dodge Boys (Harvey), Sweet Bird of Youth (The Heckler), Othello, What Do They Know About Love Uptown, Joe Egg, The Trial, Dumbwaiter, Send Me No Flowers, and The Seagull (Trigorin).  He had many brief/background television and film appearances during this time, too, in Legend of the Lost, Naked City, Search for Tomorrow, Love is a Many Splendored Thing, The Jackie Gleason Show, and Encounter, all uncredited.

His first starring role in a film would be as Nigel in A Weekend with Strangers (1971), a horror-like pornographic film that has been lost to time. His big break, though, came as the role of Father Mark Reddin in The Secret Storm in 1973. The character, a priest, was involved in a storyline in which he left the church to marry a woman (Laurie Stevens, portrayed by Stephanie Braxton), defying his religion. This was extremely controversial at the time, giving the show massive publicity and making David a relatively popular actor among soap viewers. He only remained on the show for roughly two years, though, as it got so controversial that ratings began to plummet, ultimately killing the show in 1974.

After Secret Storm, David would fade in and out of the public conscience; his next major roles being Beau Richardson in The Edge of Night (1976), Mac Macauley in Savage Weekend (1979), and Rusty Sentell, Sr. in Search for Tomorrow (1982). During this time he had many other minor roles in a slew of television series and films. He also remarried around this time and had his next child, Derek, while filming as Rusty in Search for Tomorrow.
Gale died of complications from open-heart surgery on August 18, 1991, in Los Angeles, California.

Filmography

References

External links
 

1936 births
1991 deaths
British male film actors
20th-century British male actors
People from Wimbledon, London